Charles Devens (January 1, 1910 – August 13, 2003), was a Major League Baseball pitcher who played from -. After pitching for Harvard he was signed in 1932 to the New York Yankees. At 92 years of age, Devens was the oldest surviving member of the famed 1932 world championship Yankees team and recalled with great detail  the now famous Babe Ruth's Called Shot.

Career 
Signed in 1932 and leaving the team in 1934, Devens' Major league career was cut short by his future father-in-law who refused to have a ball player as a son in law.  Devens spent the entire 1932 season on the champion Yankees' roster, despite only pitching one game that season, due to a promise the Yankees made to Devens' father as a condition for signing him.  After his departure from the big leagues Devens established his reputation as a standout businessman in Boston. Given his short 3-year career Charlie Devens was only able to amass 82 innings pitched with only one start in 1934. At the conclusion of his career, Charlie held a 5–3 record with 31 strikeouts and a 3.73 ERA in 16 games pitched.

Personal
His granddaughter was Sarah Devens. She participated on three varsity teams at Dartmouth College: field hockey, ice
hockey and lacrosse. She was named a captain of all three teams and was considered by many teammates to be the best female athlete Dartmouth
ever had.

References

External links

1910 births
2003 deaths
Harvard Crimson baseball players
Major League Baseball pitchers
Baseball players from Maine
Baseball players from Massachusetts
New York Yankees players
People from Milton, Massachusetts
People from Scarborough, Maine
Burials at Mount Auburn Cemetery